Teen Titans is an American animated superhero television series created by Glen Murakami and Sam Register and developed by Murakami, David Slack and Register. Based on DC Comics's superhero team of the same name it was produced by Warner Bros. Animation and DC Entertainment (for season 5). The show premiered on Cartoon Network on July 19, 2003; and its first two seasons also aired on Kids' WB. Initially, only four seasons were planned; but the popularity of the series led to Cartoon Network's ordering a fifth season. The final half-hour episode of the show, "Things Change", aired on January 16, 2006; it was later followed by a TV movie, Teen Titans: Trouble in Tokyo, that premiered on September 15, 2006, serving as the series finale. A 15-minute episode titled "The Lost Episode" was released as part of an online promotional campaign by Post Consumer Brands in January 2005.

Teen Titans became one of Cartoon Network's most popular series, renowned for its humor, storylines, and banter between the main characters. During its run, the series was nominated for three Annie Awards and one Motion Picture Sound Editors Award. Spin-off media included comics, DVD releases, video games, music albums, and collectible toys. In 2013, the show spawned a spin-off, titled Teen Titans Go!, which received a theatrical film that was released on July 27, 2018, titled Teen Titans Go! To the Movies. In September 2019, a crossover film with Teen Titans Go! was released, titled Teen Titans Go! vs. Teen Titans. It features the first appearance of the original series characters after 13 years.

The series was first shown on Boomerang from February 2, 2009 replacing the Super Friends until October 31, 2010. It returned to Boomerang's line-up on October 3, 2011, and left the schedule again on June 1, 2014.

Premise

Teen Titans is based primarily on stories by Marv Wolfman and George Pérez from the 1980s, featuring characters, storylines, and concepts introduced during the run, and incorporating a similar group of members. The five main members of the eponymous team in the series are Robin (Scott Menville), the intelligent and capable leader of the Teen Titans; Starfire (Hynden Walch), a quirky, curious alien princess from the planet Tamaran; Cyborg (Khary Payton), a half-human/half-robot who is known for his strength and technological prowess; Raven (Tara Strong), a stoic girl from the parallel world Azarath who draws upon dark energy and psionic abilities; and Beast Boy (Greg Cipes), a good-natured joker who can transform into various animals. They are situated in Titans Tower, a large T-shaped building featuring living quarters, a command center, and a variety of training facilities on an island just offshore from the West Coast metropolis of Jump City. The team deals with all manner of criminal activity and threats to the city, while dealing with their own struggles with adolescence, their mutual friendships, and their limitations.

The first season focuses on the Teen Titans' introduction to the mysterious supervillain Slade (Ron Perlman), who seeks to turn Robin into his apprentice. The second season is an adaptation of "The Judas Contract" storyline where new hero Terra (Ashley Johnson) joins the team while secretly plotting against them with Slade. The third season depicts Cyborg's conflict with the evil organization H.I.V.E. and their leader Brother Blood (John DiMaggio), prompting Cyborg to form the superhero team Titans East with Aqualad (Wil Wheaton), Speedy (Mike Erwin), Bumblebee (T'Keyah Crystal Keymáh), and Más y Menos (Freddy Rodriguez). In the fourth season, Raven finds herself unwillingly involved in a plot that threatens the existence of the world when her demon father Trigon (Kevin Michael Richardson) seeks to enslave the Earth. For the fifth season, the Teen Titans join forces with numerous other heroes to combat the Brotherhood of Evil, Beast Boy's longtime adversaries, and their army of villains.

Episodes

Cast and characters

Main

 Greg Cipes as Beast Boy
 Scott Menville as Robin
 Khary Payton as Cyborg
 Hynden Walch as Starfire
 Tara Strong as Raven

Secret identities

Unlike most other superhero television series, the Teen Titans characters maintain their superhero identities at all times, with any hints at the concept of an alter ego or secret identity rarely explored.

The secret identity of Robin, an alias assumed by multiple characters in the comics, is never explicitly revealed in the series. However, several hints are provided to suggest he is Dick Grayson, the original Robin and founding member of the Teen Titans:
 Robin's alternate dimensional counterpart Larry in the episode "Fractured" is named Nosyarg Kcid—"Dick Grayson" spelled backwards.
 Robin's future counterpart in the episode "How Long Is Forever?" has taken on the identity of Nightwing, Grayson's second superhero alias.
 The main romance in the show is Robin's relationship with Starfire, whom Grayson would romance in the comics.
 A glimpse into Robin's consciousness by Raven in the episode "Haunted" shows the memory of two acrobats falling from a trapeze, a reference to the death of Grayson's acrobat parents being the catalyst for him becoming Robin.
 Further connections to the Batman mythos include two references in the episode "The Apprentice, Pt. II", when Robin responds to a suggestion by the villain Slade that he "might be like a father to [him]" with "I already have a father" (which transitions to a shot of flying bats) and a fight scene on the rooftop of a building labeled Wayne Enterprises.

The Teen Titans Go! episode "Permanent Record" would satirize the mystery of Robin's identity by explicitly giving his name as "Robin v.3: Tim Drake" (the third Robin), with "Dick Grayson" and "Jason Todd" (the second Robin) being written over. Subsequent episodes, however, establish him as Dick Grayson through vague flashbacks to his boyhood at Haley Circus.

In the comics, Starfire and Raven are the real names of their respective characters. While the show does not specify this with the latter, the former acknowledges "Starfire" as the English translation of her name in the season 5 episode "Go!" and her native name, Koriand'r, is used in the season 3 episode "Betrothed". The comic versions of these characters, however, also use the civilian aliases Kory Anders and Rachel Roth, which are not used on the show.

The policy of not mentioning the characters' secret identities would be broken in the season 5 premiere "Homecoming" when Elasti-Girl refers to Beast Boy by his real name, Garfield. Cyborg's real name in the comics, Victor Stone, is referenced in the season 3 premiere "Deception" when he uses "Stone" as an undercover alias, although the series does not identify this as his real name.

Production

Soundtrack
The series is known for featuring both an English and Japanese version of its title theme song, created by Andy Sturmer and performed by the Japanese band Puffy AmiYumi. The title theme used in the regions where the show was broadcast varied; some would play only one version, while Japan - and the English language video editions - would use both, according to the respective episode's plot theme: The English lyrics for more serious stories, the Japanese version for more comedic tones.

The first-season episode "Mad Mod" also featured another song by Puffy AmiYumi, "K2G". In the feature-length film Trouble in Tokyo, a literal translation of the Japanese song, whose actual lyrics differ greatly from its English counterpart, is performed for comedic effect.

Cancellation
In mid-November 2005, TitansTower.com reported that prospects for a sixth season were looking extremely unlikely, and fans were urged to express their support for the show to Cartoon Network. Several days after this initial posting, word came that Cartoon Network had officially terminated the show. According to Wil Wheaton, the actor who provided the voice of Aqualad, the series was terminated by new Warner Bros. Feature Animation executives, who made the decision not to renew the series based on its sixth season pitch. Wheaton's story was contradicted by series story editor Rob Hoegee, who stated that the decision came from Cartoon Network, not WB, and that the crew was informed during the writing phase of season five that there were no plans for a sixth season.
The show's producer David Slack indicated that he was given different reasons for the show's cancellation; either the ratings dropped after the "scary" season 4, or Mattel wanted the show dead because Bandai had the show's toy deal.
Cartoon Network announced that Mattel had become its "master toy licensee" in 2006.

After the last episode, Warner Bros. Animation announced a feature film titled Teen Titans: Trouble in Tokyo. The film premiered at San Diego Comic-Con International and was shown on Cartoon Network first on September 15, 2006, before airing on Kids' WB on September 16, 2006, and finally releasing on DVD on February 6, 2007.

Proposed Spin-Off
As early as August of 2006, there were reports that Teen Titans may undergo a re-branding, with producer Glen Murakami citing the 1995 hiatus of Batman: The Animated Series, which was retooled in 1997 as The New Batman Adventures. According to Rob Hoegee, this had been suggested by Sam Register after he and David Slack had left the show, leaving Glen Murakami and Amy Wolfram to develop a proposal for a new show that would have expanded the team with all the new characters introduced in Season 5. However, when they had sent the pitch in, it was ultimately declined.

According to reports, the new show would have been titled New Teen Titans, and rather than focusing on the original five, would have featured a rotating cast, like Justice League Unlimited, working from 5 separate headquarters linked together by a communications system designed by Cyborg. Some of these proposed teamups included:

 Robin, Speedy, Aqualad, Kid Flash (A tribute to the original Titans from the comic book)
 Kid Flash, Mas y Menos
 Wildebeest, Jericho, Gnarkk
 Hotspot, Kilowatt, Redstar
 Raven, Starfire, Kole, Argent, Bumblebee, Pantha (In a story titled "Truth or Dare")

The show was slated to introduce new villains, notably one named "Athena" who had the Midas touch and was accompanied by an ever changing roster of superpowered suiters as well as a posse of robot girls, and see the return of fan favorites from the original series, such as Mad Mod (In a story titled "The Mad Mods"), Control Freak ("The Battle of the Geeks"), and Soto ("Planet Soto"). Series artist, Brianne Drouhard, has also stated doing visual development on a character that wasn't mentioned in the reporting. and Murakami expressed interest in Phobia, Mister Twister, Ravager.

The pitch documents included information on a holiday episode, as well as a plot line in which Herald would unknowingly create a rift in "DIMENSION X", allowing a microscopic, freeloading creature to travel with them to Earth. The creature multiplies exponentially, and in the end the New Teen Titans must battle the creature and repair the rift. According to series artist Derrick J Wyatt, this would have tied back to the original show, and the unnamed creature from the series finale, Things Change.

Crossover with Teen Titans Go!
A mid-credits scene from Teen Titans Go! To the Movies featured the 2003 Titans' return, in which Robin states they've "found a way back".

In early 2019, Warner Bros. announced that a crossover featuring the Titans from both shows, titled Teen Titans Go! vs. Teen Titans, was in development. On June 26, 2019, IGN released the official trailer on YouTube. The film premiered at the San Diego Comic-Con on July 21, 2019. This was followed by a digital release on September 24, 2019 and a DVD and Blu-ray release on October 15, 2019. The events of the film take place during the fifth season of Teen Titans Go!.

Legacy
The series was revisited as a series of shorts in 2012 for the DC Nation programming block on Cartoon Network. Dubbed New Teen Titans, the shorts began airing on September 11, 2012. The shorts featured the Titans in chibi form, with the principal cast members of the original series returning.

Ciro Nieli, one of the show's directors, would go on to create Disney's Super Robot Monkey Team Hyperforce Go!, another superhero action show with a large anime influence, but premiered in 2004 on Jetix, and featured Beast Boy's voice actor Greg Cipes as the voice of Chiro, the show's main protagonist. Sam Register, producer of the series, also made his own show in 2004 with Hi Hi Puffy AmiYumi on Cartoon Network; which was based on the pop duo who did the theme song, and also had an anime influence, but was created more to be a slapstick comedy in the veins of Looney Tunes and Tom and Jerry.

Teen Titans Go!  was announced as a spin-off, with many voices the same, but not significantly related in terms of story to both the Teen Titans series and the New Teen Titans shorts. The series premiered on April 23, 2013.

Menville, Payton, Strong, Cipes, and Walch reprised their respective character roles as Robin, Cyborg, Raven, Beast Boy, Starfire and Blackfire in DC Super Hero Girls.

Payton reprised his role as Cyborg in Lego DC Comics: Batman Be-Leaguered, Lego DC Comics Super Heroes: Justice League vs. Bizarro League, Lego DC Comics Super Heroes: Justice League – Attack of the Legion of Doom, Lego DC Comics Super Heroes: Justice League – Cosmic Clash, Lego DC Comics Super Heroes: Justice League – Gotham City Breakout along with Cipes, Walch, and Menville (although he played the Damian Wayne Robin), Lego DC Comics Super Heroes: The Flash, and Lego DC Comics Super Heroes: Aquaman: Rage of Atlantis. He has also reprised his role as Cyborg on Justice League Action.

Several character details from Teen Titans, like Raven's standard incantation Azarath Metrion Zinthos and Beast Boy's super-werewolf form from the episode "The Beast Within", were incorporated into the animated film Justice League vs. Teen Titans.

Impact on DC continuity
Teen Titans has never been established to be a part of the larger DC Animated Universe or The Batman animated series. Series producer Bruce Timm stated the series would not cross over with Justice League Unlimited. Despite this the series was alluded to in Static Shock, which is part of the DCAU like Justice League Unlimited, where Static asked Batman where Robin was to which Batman responded, "With the Titans...You'll meet them some day." The character Speedy, who first appeared in the episode "Winner Take All", later appeared in Justice League Unlimited with the same costume design and voice actor (Mike Erwin) as the Teen Titans incarnation (though he is older in appearance). Kid Flash was voiced by Michael Rosenbaum in his appearances in the show, who was the same actor who voiced the Flash in Justice League Unlimited; both characters are the Wally West incarnations. The follow-up series, Teen Titans Go!, has featured several appearances by Batman, but they have all been non-speaking appearances. Both Batman and Alfred Pennyworth appear in DC Nation's New Teen Titans "Red X Unmasked". In the season 2 episode of Teen Titans Go!, "Let's Get Serious", Aqualad (voiced by Khary Payton), Superboy, and Miss Martian of the Young Justice team appear.

Much like the DC Animated Universe (as well as X-Men: Evolution and Spider-Man and His Amazing Friends), the series has affected the comics that initially inspired it, including: Beast Boy adopting the series' purple and black outfit during DC's "52" storyline and later appearing with the pointed ears and fanged teeth originated by the series, future Cyborg having the same armor pattern of his animated counterpart in the Titans Tomorrow storyline, Raven adapting her animated counterpart's costume design in the "One Year Later" storyline, the characters Más Y Menos making appearances in 52 and the Final Crisis limited series, the character Joto was renamed "Hotspot" during 52 to match his cartoon counterpart, and the villain Cinderblock appearing in a fight with the comic incarnation of the Titans. Red X is later included in the mainstream comic publications through the two-issue teaser comic Future State Teen Titans and its follow-up series Teen Titans Academy.

Reception
Early into the series' run, Executive Producer and Cartoon Network and Warner Bros. Animation Vice President Sam Register responded to criticism regarding the style of the show with a statement slightly contradicting Murakami's statement about wanting Robin to "be cool" with his metal-tipped boots:

However, while the series' creators initially stated that younger children were the intended audience for the series, Teen Titans Go! writer J. Torres notes that the progression and deeper themes of the show widened the appeal to a much broader audience:

In 2009, Teen Titans was named the 83rd best animated series by IGN.

TVLine lists the theme song from the series among the best animated series themes of all time.

Awards and nominations
2005 Annie Awards
 Outstanding Storyboarding in an Animated Television Production (Nominated)

2004 Annie Awards
 Outstanding Music in an Animated Television Production (Nominated)
 Outstanding Storyboarding in an Animated Television Production (Nominated)

2004 Motion Picture Sound Editors Awards
 Best Sound Editing in Television Animation (Nominated)

In other media

Comics

From 2004 to 2008, DC Comics published a comic book series based on Teen Titans called Teen Titans Go!. The series was written by J. Torres and Todd Nauck, Larry Stucker was the regular illustrator. The series focuses on Robin, Raven, Starfire, Beast Boy, and Cyborg who are the main cast members of the television series. While the comic's stories stand independently, its issues were done so as not to contradict events established in the animated series' episodes. Often, Teen Titans Go! also referenced episodes of the show, as well as expanding on parts of the series.

Toys
Bandai released a line of action figures based on the Teen Titans animated series. The line included 1.5 inch "Comic Book Hero" mini figures, 3.5 inch action figures (including "Teen Titans Launch Tower Playset", "Teen Titans Command Center", "Battling Machines", "T-Vehicles", "T-Sub Deluxe Vehicles"), 5 inch action figures, 6.5 inch plush Super-D Toys, and 10 inch figures. Amongst the characters included in the line were the main members of the Teen Titans, Titans East, and various allies and villains.

See also
 Justice League (TV series)
 Justice League Unlimited
 Young Justice (TV series)

References

External links

 Official DC Comics Site
 
 David Slack Interviews: Season 1, Season 2, Season 3, Season 4, Season 5

 
2000s American animated television series
2003 American television series debuts
2006 American television series endings
American children's animated action television series
American children's animated drama television series
Animated television series about extraterrestrial life
American children's animated science fantasy television series
American children's animated comic science fiction television series
American children's animated space adventure television series
American children's animated superhero television series
Animated television series about robots
Animated television shows based on DC Comics
Anime-influenced Western animated television series
Cartoon Network original programming
Cyborgs in television
English-language television shows
Teen animated television series
Teen superhero television series
Television series about alien visitations
Television series about demons
Television series about shapeshifting
Television series by Warner Bros. Animation
Television series set on fictional planets
The WB original programming
Toonami